Loren C. Ball (born 1948) is an American amateur astronomer, who has discovered more than 100 asteroids while working at his Emerald Lane Observatory (843), built on the roof of his house on Emerald Lane, Decatur, Alabama. As of 2021, he has credit for 108 numbered designations with the Minor Planet Center at Harvard for the period between 2000 and 2004. None of them were co-discoveries. He is under contract with NASA through the University of Alabama in Huntsville to do outreach to school groups and organisations. , he promotes asteroid education in schools and on social media.

The main-belt asteroid 16095 Lorenball, discovered by astronomers with the Catalina Sky Survey in 1999, is named after him. The official  was published by the Minor Planet Center on 8 November 2019.

List of discovered minor planets

See also

References

External links 
 Barnard-Seyfert Astronomical Society page on L. C. Ball

1948 births
Living people
20th-century  American astronomers
21st-century  American astronomers
Discoverers of asteroids

Amateur astronomers